The 1972 Kansas gubernatorial election was held on November 7, 1972. Incumbent Democrat Robert Docking defeated Republican nominee Morris Kay with 62.0% of the vote.

Primary elections
Primary elections were held on August 1, 1972.

Republican primary

Candidates
Morris Kay, State Representative
John Anderson Jr., former Governor
Ray E. Frisbie,  president of the Kansas Farm Bureau
Reynolds Shultz, incumbent Lieutenant Governor

Results

General election

Candidates
Major party candidates
Robert Docking, Democratic
Morris Kay, Republican 

Other candidates
Rolland Ernest Fisher, Prohibition

Results

References

1972
Kansas
Gubernatorial